Piaras Mág Uidhir (Sometimes Anglicised to Peter Maguire) was a priest in Ireland during the 15th century.

He was Archdeacon of Clogher from 1423 to 1432; and Bishop of Clogher from then until his  resignation in 1447.He died in 1450

References

15th-century Roman Catholic bishops in Ireland
Pre-Reformation bishops of Clogher
Archdeacons of Clogher
1450 deaths